Scytinostroma galactinum is a fungal plant pathogen infecting apples.

References

External links 
 Index Fungorum
 USDA ARS Fungal Database

Fungal plant pathogens and diseases
Apple tree diseases
Russulales
Fungi described in 1851
Taxa named by Elias Magnus Fries